Steady Power (foaled 1984 in Ontario) is a Canadian Thoroughbred racehorse. Bred and raced by Kinghaven Farms, Steady Power was a versatile runner at both short and long distances whose wins included the seven-furlong Achievement Handicap, and the mile and three quarter (14 furlongs) Valedictory Handicap.

In 1989, five-year-old Steady Power enjoyed his best year, earning Canadian Champion Older Horse honours after winning the Durham Cup Handicap, the Jockey Club Cup Handicap, and a second by a head to Hodges Bay in the 1989 Rothmans International. 

A gelding, Steady Power continued to race competitively at the top levels in Canadian racing into age eight when he was claimed for $50,000 in June 1992. By October he had been dropped to a $16,000 claiming race when Kinghaven Farms bought him back and gave him the retirement he deserved.

References
 Steady Power's pedigree and partial racing stats

1984 racehorse births
Thoroughbred family 9-f
Racehorses bred in Canada
Racehorses trained in Canada
Sovereign Award winners